The Bangladesh cricket team toured Ireland, playing five One Day Internationals from 15 to  28 July 2010.  Ireland were victorious in the first ODI by 7 wickets, which marked their third ODI victory over a full member and their second over Bangladesh.  Bangladesh won the second ODI by 6 wickets, meaning the two match series was drawn.

ODI series

1st ODI

2nd ODI

Bangladeshi cricket tours of Ireland
2010 in cricket
International cricket competitions in 2010